Rainer Hradetzky (born 26 September 1952) is a German former swimmer. He competed in two events at the 1972 Summer Olympics.

References

1952 births
Living people
German male swimmers
Olympic swimmers of East Germany
Swimmers at the 1972 Summer Olympics
Swimmers from Berlin